La Grande Meute is a 1945 French film directed by Jean de Limur.

The title refers to a pack of dogs inherited by Côme de Lambrefaut through the family mansion on the death of his father. Everything else apart from the 110 hunting dogs has been mortgaged. He marries Agnès de Charençay, who shares his enthusiasm for the hunt, but this leads to the death of their son and hopes of descendants. Agnès divorces and marries a man whose wealth helps her to humiliate Côme, by buying his debts, slowly acquiring everything. In September 1939, the house is destroyed by gunfire and the dogs all escape.

The film recorded admissions in France of 1,754,414.

Cast 
 Jean Brochard: Maître Marvault
 Aimé Clariond: Martin du Bocage
 Suzanne Dantès: La marquise de Badoul
 Jean Dasté: L'huissier
 Guy Decomble: Me Frouas
 Jacques Dumesnil: Côme de Lambrefaut
 Camille Guérini: La Ramée
 Julienne Paroli: Sylvie
 Jacqueline Porel: Agnès de Charançay
 Maurice Schutz: Patrice de Lambrefaut
 Paul Villé: Le curé
 Paulette Élambert: Laurette
 Paul Barge
 Ketty Kerviel	
 Frédéric Mariotti
 Moriss

References

External links
La Grande Meute at IMDb
La Grande Meute at Uni France

1945 films
Films directed by Jean de Limur
French black-and-white films
French drama films
1945 drama films
1940s French films